Theyazin bin Haitham Al Said (born 21 August 1990) is the de facto Crown Prince of Oman as the oldest son of Sultan Haitham bin Tariq. Although the official procedure of appointment - as prescribed by the new Basic Law of the State (Oman´s Constitution of 2021) - has not yet taken the place, there is no doubt as to who is the “Crown Prince of Oman”. Theyazin currently holds the office of the Minister of Culture, Youth and Sports (as did his father under the rule of Sultan Qaboos). Mechanism set up by the constitution of 2021 makes Theyazin a future Crown Prince of Oman.

Biography

Sayyid Theyazin (pronounced Dhi-Yazan) bin Haitham bin Tariq attended  Oxford University, graduating with a bachelor's degree in Political Science. In July 2022 he graduated from the Royal Military Academy Sandhurst.

His father is Sayyid Haitham bin Tariq, the current Sultan of Oman. His mother is Sayyida Ahad bint Abdullah bin Hamad Al Busaidiyah, the Honorable Lady. He has one brother and two sisters. His paternal uncle Sayyid Asad bin Tariq is the Deputy Prime Minister for relations and international cooperation affairs, and his other paternal uncle Sayyid Shihab bin Tariq is the Deputy Prime Minister for Defense Affairs. The former Sultan, Qaboos bin Said, is his father's cousin.

Theyazin has been Minister of Culture, Sports and Youth since 18 August 2020. He previously worked at the Omani Embassy in London for five years from 2014 (second secretary). He has also worked at the foreign ministry from 2013, according to Omani media.

See also 
 List of current heirs apparent

References

Al Said dynasty
1990 births
20th-century Omani people
Alumni of Oxford Brookes University
Graduates of the Royal Military Academy Sandhurst
Culture ministers of Oman
Sports ministers of Oman
Heirs apparent
Living people
Omani Ibadi Muslims
People from Muscat, Oman
Sons of Omani sultans